"Tube Snake Boogie" is a song by American rock band ZZ Top from their 1981 album El Loco. It was released as a single the same year and reached No. 4 on the Billboard Mainstream Rock chart.

While the lyrics seem to imply sexual innuendo or double entendre, in the liner notes for the band's 1992 Greatest Hits album, it is explained that "'tube snake' is gnarly lingo for a surfboard, or 'boogie board.' Either way, it's good clean fun." However, this claim of surfing belies the lyrical content clearly indicating that the 'boogieing' is done at night.

The song was produced by Bill Ham, and recorded and mixed by Terry Manning.

Record World said that "Frank Beard's jungle drums on the intro are ample warning that the energetic trio is ready to boogie" and noted the "virtuoso guitar work and gritty vocal."

Cover versions
 Serbian hard rock band Cactus Jack recorded a version on their live cover album DisCover in 2002.
 Canadian blues guitarist Bill Durst recorded a version on his 2005 album, The Wharncliff Sessions.

Charts

Personnel
Billy Gibbons - guitar, lead vocals
Dusty Hill - bass, backing vocals
Frank Beard - drums, percussion

References

1981 singles
ZZ Top songs
Songs written by Frank Beard (musician)
Songs written by Dusty Hill
Songs written by Billy Gibbons
1981 songs
Warner Records singles
Songs about dancing
Song recordings produced by Bill Ham